Lucien Servanty (born in 1909 in Paris, died 7 October 1973 in Toulouse) was a French aeronautical engineer. A graduate from the Ecole des Arts et Métiers, he joined Breguet in 1937, then worked at the SNCASO, where he was involved in the redesign of late variants of the Bloch MB.150 line. During World War II, he designed the SO.6000 Triton, France's first jet aircraft. But Lucien Servanty is probably best remembered today for being one of the main engineers behind Concorde (fastest general, public usage plane ever produced).

Sources
http://pdennez.free.fr/hommes/html/h031a.html

Concorde
French aerospace engineers
1973 deaths
1909 births